Peter Gunn (born 13 February 1963) is an English actor. He has appeared in several TV series and TV films.

On British television, Gunn is known as the character Len Cosgrove in the BBC series Born and Bred as well as dozens of guest-starring and recurring roles in other television series and films such as Frost, Heartburn Hotel and Sunshine. To American audiences, he is probably best known for portraying Oswald Granger in the 2009 film Hannah Montana: The Movie.

Peter has also appeared in Coronation Street as Brian Packham, former partner of Julie Carp and former Headmaster of Bessie Street School since 2010. He also starred as Pat Kennedy on the ITV drama series London's Burning in 2000.

He has two sons, George and Tom.

Filmography

References

External links

1963 births
Living people
English male television actors
English male film actors
People from Lytham St Annes